Synodontis waterloti is a species of upside-down catfish native to waters of western Africa.  This species grows to a length of  TL.  This species is a minor component of local commercial fisheries.

References

External links 

waterloti
Freshwater fish of West Africa
Taxa named by Jacques Daget
Fish described in 1962